The Winter Paralympic Games  is an international multi-sport event where athletes with physical disabilities compete in snow and ice sports. The event includes athletes with mobility impairments, amputations, blindness, and cerebral palsy. The Winter Paralympic Games are held every four years directly following the Winter Olympic Games and (since 1992) hosted in the same city. The International Paralympic Committee (IPC) oversees the Games. Medals are awarded in each event: with gold for first place, silver for second, and bronze for third, following the tradition that the Olympic Games began in 1904.

The Winter Paralympics began in 1976 in Örnsköldsvik, Sweden. Those Games were the first Paralympics that featured athletes other than those in wheelchairs. The Games have expanded and grown, including the Summer Paralympic Games, to become part of the largest international sporting event after the Olympics. Given their expansion, the need for a very specific classification system has arisen. This system has also given rise to controversy and opened the door for various forms of cheating, which has tainted the integrity of the Games.

Norway has been the top-ranking (medals) nation for fourth Paralympic Winter Games: 1980,1988, 1994 and 1998. Germany has been the top-ranking (medals) for third Paralympic Winter Games: 1976, 2002, and 2010. Russia (2006 and 2014) and United States (1992 and 2018) have been the top-ranking nation two time each. Austria (1984) and China (2022) have been the top-ranking nation one time each.

History
The origins of the Winter Paralympics are much similar to the Summer Paralympics.  Injured soldiers returning from World War II sought sports as an avenue to healing.  Organized by Dr. Ludwig Guttmann, sports competitions between British convalescent hospitals began in 1948 and continued until 1960 when a parallel Olympics was held in Rome after the 1960 Summer Olympics.  Over 400 wheelchair athletes competed at the 1960 Paralympic Games, which became known as the first Paralympics.

 Sepp Zwicknagl, a pioneer of snow sports for disabled athletes, was a double-leg amputee Austrian skier who experimented skiing using prosthetics.  His work helped pioneer technological advances for people with disabilities who wished to participate in winter sports.  Advances were slow and it was not until 1974 that the first official world ski competition for physically impaired athletes, featuring downhill and a cross-country skiing, was held.  The first Winter Paralympics were held in 1976 at Örnsköldsvik, Sweden from February 21–28. Alpine and Nordic skiing for amputees and visually impaired athletes where the main events but ice sledge racing was included as a demonstration event.  There were 198 participating athletes from 16 countries, and it was the first time athletes with impairments other than wheelchair athletes were permitted to compete.

Starting in 1988 the Summer Paralympics were held in the same host city as the Summer Olympic Games.  This was due to an agreement reached between the International Olympic Committee (IOC) and the International Paralympic Committee (IPC).  The 1992 Winter Paralympics were the first Winter Games to use the same facilities as the Winter Olympics.

Cheating

Athletes have cheated by over-representing impairment to have a competitive advantage, and the use of performance-enhancing drugs.  German skier Thomas Oelsner became the first Winter Paralympian to test positive for steroids in 2002.  He had won two gold medals in the alpine events but was stripped of his medals. One concern now facing Paralympic officials is the technique of boosting blood pressure, known as autonomic dysreflexia.  The increase in blood pressure can improve performance by 15% and is most effective in the endurance sports such as cross-country skiing.  To increase blood pressure athletes will deliberately cause trauma to limbs below a spinal injury.  This trauma can include breaking bones, strapping extremities in too tightly and using high-pressured compression stockings.  The injury is painless to the athlete but affects the body and impacts the athlete's blood pressure, as can techniques like allowing the bladder to overfill.

International Paralympic Committee (IPC) found evidence that the Disappearing Positive Methodology was in operation at the 2014 Winter Paralympics in Sochi. On 7 August 2016, the IPC's Governing Board voted unanimously to ban the entire Russian team from the 2016 Summer Paralympics, citing the Russian Paralympic Committee's inability to enforce the IPC's Anti-Doping Code and the World Anti-Doping Code which is "a fundamental constitutional requirement". IPC President Sir Philip Craven stated that the Russian government had "catastrophically failed its Para athletes". IPC Athletes' Council Chairperson Todd Nicholson said that Russia had used athletes as "pawns" in order to "show global prowess".

Disability categories
The IPC has established six disability categories applying to both the Summer and Winter Paralympics.  Athletes with one of these physical disabilities are able to compete in the Paralympics though not every sport can allow for every disability category.

Amputee: Athletes with a partial or total loss of at least one limb.
Cerebral Palsy: Athletes with non-progressive brain damage, for example cerebral palsy, traumatic brain injury, stroke or similar disabilities affecting muscle control, balance or coordination.
Intellectual Disability: Athletes with a significant impairment in intellectual functioning and associated limitations in adaptive behavior.
Wheelchair: Athletes with spinal cord injuries and other disabilities which require them to compete in a wheelchair.
Visually Impaired: Athletes with vision impairment ranging from partial vision, sufficient to be judged legally blind, to total blindness.
Les Autres: Athletes with a physical disability that does not fall strictly under one of the other five categories, such as dwarfism, multiple sclerosis or congenital deformities of the limbs such as that caused by thalidomide (the name for this category is French for "the others").

Classifications

Within the six disability categories the athletes still need to be divided according to their level of impairment.  The classification systems differ from sport to sport.  The systems are designed to open up Paralympic sports to as many athletes as possible, who can participate in fair competitions against athletes with similar levels of ability.  The closest equivalents in non-disabled competitions are age classifications in junior sports, and weight divisions in wrestling, boxing, and weightlifting.  Classifications vary in accordance with the different skills required to perform the sport.  The biggest challenge in the classification system is how to account for the wide variety and severity of disabilities.  As a result, there will always be a range of impairment within a classification.  What follows is a list of the Winter Paralympic sports and a general description of how they are classified.

Alpine skiing:
There are two events in alpine skiing: slalom and giant slalom.  Alpine skiing accommodates athletes with the following physical limitations: spinal injury, Cerebral Palsy, amputation, Les Autres and blindness/visual impairment.  There are eleven classifications, seven for standing athletes, three for sitting athletes, and three for visually impaired athletes.  The divisions are defined by the degree of the athletes' function and the need for assistive equipment (prosthesis, ski poles, etc.). Snowboard Cross is technically now included in this category, though competition will take place with only limited classifications (see below).

Biathlon:
Biathlon is a combination of cross-country skiing with target shooting.  It requires physical stamina and accurate shooting.  The events are open to athletes with physical disabilities and visual impairments.  There are fifteen classes in which athletes will be placed depending on their level of function.  Twelve divisions are for athletes with a physical impairment and three divisions are for athletes with a visual impairment.  The athletes compete together and their finishing times are entered into a formula with their disability class to determine the athletes' overall finish order.  Visually impaired athletes are able to compete through the use of acoustic signals.  The signal intensity varies depending upon whether or not the athlete is on target.

Cross-country skiing:
Cross-country skiing, also known as Nordic skiing is open to athletes with Cerebral Palsy, amputations, the need for a wheelchair, visual impairment and intellectual impairment.  There are fifteen classifications, three for visually impaired athletes, nine for standing athletes and three for seated athletes.  The divisions are determined in a similar fashion to alpine skiing with attention given to the athletes' level of function and need for assistive devices.

Ice Sledge Hockey:
Ice sledge hockey is open only to male competitors with a physical disability in the lower part of their body. The game is played using international hockey rules with some modifications. Athletes sit on sledges with two blades that allow the puck to go beneath the sledge. They also use two sticks, which have a spike-end for pushing and a blade-end for shooting. The athletes are classified into three groups: group 1 is for athletes with no sitting balance or with major impairment in both upper and lower limbs, group 2 is for athletes with some sitting balance and moderate impairment in their extremities and athletes in group 3 have good balance and mild impairment in their upper and lower limbs.

Wheelchair curling:
Wheelchair curling is a coed team event for athletes with permanent lower limb disabilities that require them to use a wheelchair in their daily lives.  Athletes with Cerebral Palsy or Multiple Sclerosis can also play if they use a wheelchair.  Delivery of the stone can be by hand release or the use of a pole.  There are no classifications in this event except the requirement that all athletes participating must have need for a wheelchair for daily mobility.

Para-snowboarding:
On 2 May 2012, the International Paralympic Committee (IPC) officially sanctioned "para-snowboarding" (commonly known as adaptive snowboarding) as a medal event in the 2014 Winter Paralympic Games under Alpine Skiing.  There were men's and women's standing snowboard cross competitions. The sport's Paralympic debut featured events for only athletes with overall lower-limb impairments. Athletes with amputations were permitted to wear a prosthesis. The events were held in a time trial format, but no accommodation was made based on an athlete's level of impairment. At the 2018 Winter Paralympics, the number of events increased from 2 to 10 with the split of the lower limb classifications into two sub-groups (LL-1 for greater impairment and LL-2 for lesser impairment), and the addition of the banked slalom. The snowboard cross event was run in a head-to-head format with multiple knockout heats to determine the medal winners.  In 2022, events for athletes with upper-limb impairments were added, but the IPC eliminated the LL-1 category for women due to a dearth of athletes in that class. Those athletes were initially barred from competing at all until Brenna Huckaby of the United States prevailed in a lawsuit to "compete up" against the LL-2 class.

List of Paralympic sports

A number of different sports have been part of the Paralympic program at one point or another.

All-time medal table 

According to official data of the International Paralympic Committee. This table lists the top 20 nations, as ranked by number of golds, then silvers, then bronzes.

Winter Paralympics (1976–2022)

List of Winter Paralympic Games

See also

Summer Paralympic Games

References

External links

Paralympic Link Directory
Official IPC Website
Paralympics History By Susana Correia in Accessible Portugal Online Magazine

 

Recurring sporting events established in 1976
Winter multi-sport events
Quadrennial sporting events